Siber cabinet was the government of Northern Cyprus between 6 June 2013 and 2 September 2013, led by Prime Minister Sibel Siber. It was formed as an interim caretaker government after the Küçük cabinet led by İrsen Küçük of the National Unity Party fell in a vote of no confidence. It led Northern Cyprus until the 2013 parliamentary election.

Composition 
The composition of the cabinet was as seen below:

References 

Cabinets of Northern Cyprus